is a Japanese fashion model, tarento and singer. She is represented with Next Satisfaction Factor.

While moving to Tokyo from Miyazaki Prefecture, Kanbe was invited to the staff of the women fashion magazine JJ in Shibuya at the age of nineteen and became a reader model. She mainly worked as an "S-size" model for the magazine. Kanbe is left-handed (but she sometimes uses her right hand when writing with a pen).

After graduating from university, she was employed to an textile company, but due to the promotion of its products, she continued to work as a reader model with company approval, and she fainted with pressure and retired, and continued to work as a free reader model for two years after that.

Kanbe was later scouted by her former entertainment office, Artist-house Pyramid, in 2008, and became popular as a tarento after making appearances in television programmes, in which made regular appearances, and made other works such as her singing début with the Hexagon unit Mai Satoda with Goda Kazoku, and publishing essay books.

Filmography

Modelling works

Former modelling works

TV programmes
 Regular appearances

 Former appearances

 Dramas

PV

Advertising

Others

Awards

Bibliography and discography

Photo albums

Books

Books with DVD

Magazines

CD

DVD

References

Notes

External links
 
 
 

Japanese television personalities
Japanese female models
People from Miyazaki Prefecture
1982 births
Living people
Models from Miyazaki Prefecture